Raïssa Dapina (born 27 September 1995) is a French-Senegalese handball player for Fleury Loiret HB and the Senegalese national team.

She competed at the 2019 World Women's Handball Championship in Japan.

References

External links

1995 births
Living people
Senegalese female handball players
Handball players from Paris
French female handball players
French sportspeople of Senegalese descent